Renae Nicole Cuéllar Cuéllar (born Renae Nicole Garcia, 24 June 1990) is an American-born Mexican professional footballer who plays as a forward for Liga MX Femenil club Tijuana and the Mexico women's national team.

Early life
Born in Bellflower, California to Andrés García and Dolores Cuéllar, Renae attended Los Altos High School in Hacienda Heights, California where she was a three-year letterwinner and three time all-conference, all-city, all-district, all-region, and Offensive Player of the Year. In 2005, she was named Rookie of the Year.

Cuéllar played for the club team CRSC Infinity G U-19 Premier League and was a member of the Cal South Olympic Development Program State team for five years and Region IV Olympic Development Program for four years. She was also a member of the United States U-14 to U-18 national pool teams.

University
Cuéllar attended the University of Arizona and played for the Wildcats from 2008 to 2011. As a freshman, she appeared in 19 games for the Wildcats, starting 18 of them as forward. She was named to the All-Pac-10 Freshman team and was selected as honorable mention for the All-Pac-10 Team. She tied for the team lead with five goals and second on the team with assists with two. Cuéllar led the Wildcats in shots on goal with 48, game winning goals with four, and came in second on the team with total points with 12. During her sophomore year, she was responsible for over a third of the team's scoring and nearly a quarter of the team's total attempts at goal. She led the team in points with 12, goals with six, shots at 43 and shots on goal at 21. She was an honorable mention selection to the All-Pac-10 team the same year. As a junior, Cuéllar scored six goals and provided three assists in the first six games of the season, before suffering a season-ending knee injury.

In 2012, she transferred to the University of Oklahoma and played for the Oklahoma Sooners during her senior year. Cuéllar led the Sooners with 26 points from a team-high 12 goals, which ranked as the third-most in a single season in school history. She made OU soccer history by being named the 2012 Big 12 Conference Offensive Player of the Year and became the first member of the Oklahoma program to earn a spot on the National Soccer Coaches Association of America (NSCAA) All-Central Region First Team. Cuellar also earned All-Big 12 First Team and Big 12 All-Newcomer Team honors. She was named Big 12 Newcomer of the Week twice in 2012, earned national honors when she was named Disney Soccer/NSCAA Player of the Week after scoring game-winning goals against Kansas and TCU.

Playing career

Club

FC Kansas City
In 2013, as part of the NWSL Player Allocation, Cuéllar joined FC Kansas City in the new National Women's Soccer League. On 13 April, Cuéllar scored the first goal in NWSL history versus Portland Thorns FC. Cuellar made 11 appearances with eight starts for the Blues, scoring five goals. She missed two games after spraining her knee and ankle during a match against the Portland Thorns FC after being tackled by defender, Rachel Buehler. FCKC traded her to Seattle mid-season.

Seattle Reign FC
On 1 July 2013, FCKC traded Cuéllar to the Seattle Reign FC in exchange for Teresa Noyola, a second round pick in the 2014 NWSL College Draft and rights to unsigned player, Nikki Krzysik. She made seven appearances for the Reign, including three starts, tallying a total of 342 minutes on the pitch.

Sundsvalls DFF
After the conclusion of the 2013 NWSL season, Cuéllar signed with Swedish side, Sundsvalls DFF. She made her debut for the club on 22 August in a match against IF Limhamn Bunkeflo. She scored her first goal for the squad on 30 August during the team's 1–5 defeat to Sirius.

Washington Spirit
In October 2013, Seattle Reign FC traded Cuéllar to the Washington Spirit.

Kiryat Gat
Cuéllar gave birth to her son Romeo in April 2017. She resumed soccer training with men's club Las Vegas Lights FC, where her husband Carlos Alvarez was on the roster. In August 2018 she agreed a contract with Israeli Ligat Nashim club Kiryat Gat.

Stjarnan
In March 2019, she signed with Stjarnan of the Icelandic Úrvalsdeild kvenna.

Club Tijuana
In July 2019, Cuellar signed with Tijuana Xolos in Liga MX Femenil.

International 
Cuéllar represented Mexico at the FIFA U-20 Women's World Cup in Germany in 2010. She scored a goal in Mexico's 3–3 draw against Japan and netted the game winner in the 62nd minute in a 1–0 victory over England.

Cuéllar was an alternate for the Mexico women's national football team at the 2011 FIFA Women's World Cup in Germany.

Cuéllar was named to the Mexico women's national football team roster for the 2015 FIFA Women's World Cup in Canada. Cuéllar played in all three matches for Mexico. When Mexico embarrassingly failed to qualify for the 2019 FIFA Women's World Cup in France, Cuéllar criticized the team's management for not selecting her, alleging that she'd been left out due to her recent childbirth.

Personal life
Cuéllar is married to former footballer Carlos Alvarez. They have a son, Romeo, who was born in April 2017.

References

External links
 
 
 
 Renae Cuéllar at FC Kansas City
 Renae Cuéllar at University of Oklahoma
 
 Renae Cuéllar at Club Tijuana Femenil 
 Profile at Mexican Football Federation 
  

1990 births
Living people
Citizens of Mexico through descent
Mexican women's footballers
Women's association football forwards
Mexico women's international footballers
2015 FIFA Women's World Cup players
WK League players
2. Frauen-Bundesliga players
BV Cloppenburg players
F.C. Kiryat Gat (women) players
Renae Cuéllar
Stjarnan women's football players
Liga MX Femenil players
Club Tijuana (women) footballers
Mexican expatriate women's footballers
Mexican expatriate sportspeople in Sweden
Expatriate women's footballers in Sweden
Mexican expatriate sportspeople in South Korea
Expatriate women's footballers in South Korea
Mexican expatriate sportspeople in Germany
Mexican expatriate sportspeople in Israel
Expatriate women's footballers in Israel
Mexican expatriate sportspeople in Iceland
Expatriate women's footballers in Iceland
American women's soccer players
Soccer players from California
Sportspeople from Los Angeles County, California
People from Bellflower, California
American sportspeople of Mexican descent
Arizona Wildcats women's soccer players
Oklahoma Sooners women's soccer players
National Women's Soccer League players
FC Kansas City players
OL Reign players
Washington Spirit players
American expatriate women's soccer players
American expatriate sportspeople in Sweden
American expatriate sportspeople in South Korea
American expatriate soccer players in Germany
American expatriate sportspeople in Israel
American expatriate sportspeople in Iceland
Sundsvalls DFF players
Elitettan players